The Taurus Project of the German  aims to re-create the extinct aurochs, the wild ancestor of domestic cattle, by cross-breeding Heck cattle (themselves bred in the 1920s and 1930s in an attempt to replicate the aurochs) with aurochs-like cattle, mostly from Southern Europe. Herds of these cross-bred Taurus cattle have been established in Germany, Denmark, Hungary and Latvia, and are used in conservation of natural landscapes and biodiversity.

History 
In 1996 the conservation group  in Germany started to crossbreed Heck cattle with primitive cattle from Southern Europe such as Chianina, Sayaguesa Cattle and the Spanish fighting bull in the Lippeaue reserve near the town of Soest. The purpose was and is an increased resemblance to the extinct aurochs, because they considered Heck cattle not satisfying. For example, they write in one of their publications: "The 'recreations' by the Heck brothers are too small, too short-legged, not elegant and their horns are not satisfying". Therefore, the goal is to breed cattle that are considerably larger, more long-legged and long-snouted and have horns curving forwards, in addition to possessing the wild type colour scheme that was already present in the population. In 2003 breeding herds were started in Hungary and Denmark, and in 2004 one was begun in Latvia.

Germany 
In Germany, Taurus cattle herds are crossed with Chianina and Sayaguesa, two very tall breeds, and initially also the Spanish fighting bull (Toro de Lidia). The crossbred animals in the Lippeaue reserve, the most important breeding location, are composed of 47% Sayaguesa, 29% Heck cattle, 20% Chianina and 4% Lidia on average. By 2013, some individuals were of the fifth cross generation already.

Taurus cattle are listed in the herdbook X of the German Heck cattle association VFA. There is an increasing interest of Heck cattle breeders in using Taurus cattle because of their larger resemblance to the aurochs, so that there is a continuum between Taurus cattle and un-crossed Heck cattle.

Hungary 
Hortobágy National Park in Hungary has the largest herd of Taurus cattle so far, counting 500–600 individuals of which around 200 are mature cows. In addition to crossbred cattle that were imported from Germany, Ankole-Watusi, Hungarian Grey cattle crosses and one half-Holstein Friesian cow are used. There are two sub-herds, a main herd at Pentezug and another one at Karácsonyfok. Studies in the national park showed that cattle are less adapted to dry, cold grassland than Przewalski horses, and until a few years ago the cattle were supplementary fed. The winter of 2011 was the first winter in which additional food was not necessary.

Denmark 

Taurus breeding was initiated in Lille Vildmose Nature Reserve under the name Projekt Urokse ("Project Aurochs").  The founding herd consisted of one Chianina × Heck bull, four Heck cows and one Sayaguesa × Heck cow, and in 2009 three Sayaguesa bulls were added.  As of 2010, the herd had grown to a size of 56 individuals.

Latvia 
In Latvia, Taurus cattle are being bred by WWF Latvia. In February 2004, besides two German animals 21 head of Dutch Heck cattle were brought to Pape Nature Reserve, in October another 18 head of Dutch Heck cattle followed.

External features of Taurus cattle 
Most Taurus cattle are long-legged and comparatively slender. An increase in size was achieved, large Taurus bulls measure 165 cm at the withers while normal Heck bulls measure only 140 cm. Particularly the Sayaguesa-influenced animals are long-snouted. Most bulls are black with a light dorsal stripe, some bulls have a light colour saddle. Cows are on average, but not always, a lighter colour than the bulls, most of them are coloured reddish brown or dark brown. Some cows are as of yet still greyish or beige due to Chianina influence. The horns of most Taurus cattle face forwards and also more inwards compared to un-crossed Heck cattle, but the exact curvature of the horns is variable to a certain degree. The skull is longer and more straight-profiled than that of Heck cattle. Usually, Taurus cattle have a more athletic body than Heck cattle do, and their shoulder region ("hump") is more developed.

Gallery 
Lippeaue (Germany)

References

External links 

 Margret Bunzel-Drüke, Edgar Reisinger: Taurus cattle. A stand-in for the aurochs. (Archived version.) 2010. Pdf of ppt. Retrieved 24 May 2014.

Cattle breeding
Ecological experiments
1996 establishments in Germany
Rewilding